Educational Television (ETV) is a series of educational television programmes jointly produced by Radio Television Hong Kong and the Education Bureau (formerly the  Education and Manpower Bureau / Education Department) of Hong Kong. ETV has been an auxiliary means for teaching the primary and secondary school curriculum on television since the early 1970s.

ETV programmes change with the curriculum from time to time, covering a wide spectrum of topics.  Programmes are broadcast during daytime non-peak hours on the English channels of TVB and ATV from Monday to Friday, during the 32 weeks of the school year.  As the popularity of the Internet has increased, ETV has made its programmes available on the World Wide Web on demand.

History
ETV began with the primary school curriculum and developed gradually.  In 1972, the first programme  was aimed at Primary 3 students.  It extended one level up yearly and covered Primary 6 in 1974.  In September 1976, ETV started to cover junior secondary school.  It began with Secondary 1 and reached Secondary 3 in 1978.  There was no major change in range until 1999.  ETV extended to Primary 1 and 2 in junior primary and Secondary 4 and 5 on selected topics in senior secondary school. In 2000, ETV also began to broadcast Teacher Resource Programmes for teachers.

In April 2020, ETV stops filming new episodes. On 12 May 2020, the Education Bureau notified RTHK that it had to hand over the Education Television Centre in Kowloon Tong by September 2020.

Programmes
The programmes are closely tied with the curriculum devised by Hong Kong Government.  Most of programmes are in the Cantonese language.  In the early days, it covered the primary subjects of Chinese language, English language and Mathematics, and the secondary subjects Social Studies, Health Education (absent in secondary school) and Nature (later renamed to Science).  Programme topics are changed weekly for primary school and biweekly for secondary school.  The length of a programme is 15 minutes for primary school and 20 for secondary.  Later the secondary subjects were merged to General Studies for primary school as the curriculum changed.  As Putonghua has become increasingly important in Hong Kong, it was introduced into the Hong Kong curriculum, and ETV now produces programmes in the language.  Social Studies for secondary schools was renamed to Personal, Social and Humanities Education.

Media
During normal school terms, ETV programmes are broadcast from Monday to Friday (except some long school vacations like public holidays and weekend) on the free-to-air terrestrial television channels such: TVB Pearl and ATV World alternately so that one of the stations broadcasts ETV television programmes in the morning from 08:00 until 12:00 HKT on TVB Pearl and television programmes in the noon from 12:00 until 16:00 HKT on ATV World. In each academic year the two English free-to-air terrestrial television stations such: TVB Pearl and ATV World.

From school year 2006-07 to 2011-12, the broadcasting hours for ETV programmes reduced to 2 hours on each channel, which was scheduled from 08:30 until 10:30 HKT on TVB Pearl, and from 14:00 until 16:00 HKT on ATV World.

Beginning from school year 2012-13, the broadcasting hours further reduced to 1 hour on each channel, which is scheduled from 09:00 until 10:00 HKT (Morning session) on TVB Pearl and from 15:00 until 16:00 HKT (Afternoon session) on ATV World.

Due to the expiration of license of Asia Television on 2 April 2016, the Afternoon session of ETV programmes is scheduled from 15:00 until 16:00 HKT on RTHK 31A, which simulcast with Digital Channel RTHK 31.

Although each programme is broadcast several times a week, their broadcast times are not adapted to school class timetables. The government therefore provides necessary television and recording equipment for reception of ETV programmes for government schools and aided schools in Hong Kong. The recorded programmes can then be viewed out of the broadcast time frame as required by the school.

Some programmes are distributed in form of VCDs or interactive multimedia CD-ROMs to schools.

With the coming of the Internet age, ETV programmes and other materials can be obtained from ETV website eTVonline. Additionally, from June 6, 2020, the broadcasting hours of ETV on TVB Pearl will be lifted.

References

External links
Official website in Education Bureau
eTV Online
HKEdCity website

Education in Hong Kong
Television in Hong Kong
Internet in Hong Kong
Educational television series
1970s Hong Kong television series
1972 Hong Kong television series debuts